Andrés Andrade may refer to:
Andrés Andrade (footballer, born 1989), Colombian football midfielder
Andrés Andrade (footballer, born 1998), Panamanian football left-back
Andrés Andrade (tennis), Ecuadorian tennis player

See also
André Andrade (disambiguation)